AMF Technotransport was a locomotive and railway rolling stock maintenance facility in Pointe-Saint-Charles, an area of Montreal, Quebec, Canada. It was originally the Pointe-Saint-Charles shops of Canadian National Railways (CNR) and became a separate subsidiary in 1993 under the name AMF Technotransport.

In 1995, CN awarded a contract to manage AMF to GEC-Alsthom. In 1996, CNR sold AMF to GEC-Alsthom. GEC-Alsthom subsequently changed its name to Alstom. By 1998, Alstom had dropped the AMF name and identified the facility as Alstom's Montreal remanufacturing centre or its Montreal rail centre.

References

Companies based in Montreal
Canadian National Railway subsidiaries
Defunct locomotive manufacturers of Canada